The black-tailed monarch (Symposiachrus verticalis) is a species of bird in the family Monarchidae.
It is endemic to the Bismarck Archipelago of Papua New Guinea. Its natural habitat is subtropical or tropical moist lowland forests.

Taxonomy and systematics
This species was originally placed in the genus Monarcha until moved to Symposiachrus in 2009. Alternate names include Bismarck monarch, Bismarck pied monarch, Duke of York monarch, New Britain monarch, New Britain pied monarch and York monarch.

Subspecies
There are two subspecies recognized: 
 Djaul monarch (S. v. ateralbus) - (Salomonsen, 1964): Originally described as a separate species in the genus Monarcha. Found on Dyaul Island (off north-western New Ireland)
 S. v. verticalis - (P. L. Sclater, 1877): Found on the main islands of the Bismarck Archipelago

References

black-tailed monarch
Birds of the Bismarck Archipelago
black-tailed monarch
black-tailed monarch
Taxonomy articles created by Polbot